Dachshund homolog 2 is a protein that in humans is encoded by the DACH2 gene.

Function 
This gene is one of two genes which encode a protein similar to the Drosophila protein dachshund, a transcription factor involved in cell fate determination in the eye, limb and genital disc of the fly. The encoded protein contains two characteristic dachshund domains: an N-terminal domain responsible for DNA binding and a C-terminal domain responsible for protein-protein interactions. This gene is located on the X chromosome and is subject to inactivation by DNA methylation. The encoded protein may be involved in regulation of organogenesis and myogenesis, and may play a role in premature ovarian failure.

References

Further reading